Obręb may refer to the following places:
Obręb, Piaseczno County in Masovian Voivodeship (east-central Poland)
Obręb, Pułtusk County in Masovian Voivodeship (east-central Poland)
Obręb, Sierpc County in Masovian Voivodeship (east-central Poland)
Obręb, Żuromin County in Masovian Voivodeship (east-central Poland)